Unieuro S.p.A. is the largest Italian retailer of consumer electronics and household appliances by number of outlets, with a network of 460 stores throughout Italy.

The company, which reported net revenues of €1.66bln for the fiscal year ended February 28, 2017, debuted on Borsa Italiana (the Italian Stock Exchange), by listing on STAR Segment, on April 4, 2017 under the UNIR ticker.

In 2017, Unieuro also announced and completed the acquisition of e-commerce operator Monclick S.r.l. and of further 21 direct stores from Andreoli S.p.A. in Central Italy.

History

Led by CEO Giancarlo Nicosanti Monterastelli, Unieuro S.p.A. formerly traded as SGM Distribuzione, a company that has been controlled by private equity fund Rhone Capital since 2005 and that operated under the Marco Polo-Expert brand name in Italy.

In 2013, SGM Distribuzione signed an agreement with Dixons Retail to acquire the old-Unieuro, an independent Italian electronics and domestic appliances retailer founded in 1967, which Dixons took over in 2001.

As a result of the transaction, former Unieuro business merged into SGM/Marco Polo-Expert, under the renewed brand-name of Unieuro S.p.A. In October 2017, It was reported that Unieuro entered into a contract to acquire Cerioni Group branch company consisting of 19 direct stores, currently operating under the brand Euronics.

On April 6, 2021, Iliad SA became the first shareholder of Unieuro following the acquisition, through Iliad Holding S.p.A. and Iliad S.A., of a company share close to 12%.

References

External links
 

Companies of Italy
Retail companies of Italy
Retail companies established in 1937
Italian companies established in 1937